Tim Lander (born 26 February 1938) is a Canadian poet.

Born in Surrey, England, he studied at the University of London. In 1964, Lander emigrated to Canada. He lived primarily in Vancouver, where he began publishing chapbooks of his poetry.

He now lives in Nanaimo, British Columbia. Lander can be seen regularly playing a penny-whistle in front of the Regional Library branch at the Krall space (downtown Nanaimo). He survives by selling his poetry and enjoys the generosity of verbal exchange with passers-by.

Bibliography
Street Heart Poems (1993)
Pecunia Non Olet (1997)
The Glass Book: Poems (1999)
The Book of Prejudices (2002)
Inappropriate Behaviour (2006)

1938 births
Living people
Writers from British Columbia
Canadian male poets
People from Surrey
Alumni of the University of London
English emigrants to Canada
20th-century Canadian poets
20th-century Canadian male writers